Andrew "Drew" Spencer Helm (born November 9, 1984) is an American soccer player, who currently plays forward for the South Florida Surf of the Premier Development League, a fourth-tier football league in the United States.

Early life and collegiate career
Drew Helm was born in Jupiter, Florida. His older brother Ryan is a pro surfer, and both brothers were known as freediving spear-fishermen. He attended Jupiter Community High School.

Helm began his collegiate soccer career at the University of South Florida.  He played two years at USF, appearing in 17 matches, notching 3 goals and 7 assists.  In 2005, he transferred to Florida Atlantic University, but after only appearing in 4 matches, scoring 2 goals, he was injured for the remainder of the season.

Professional career
Despite his injury-plagued year, Helm was invited to the 2006 Adidas MLS Combine, where his performance earned him the first overall selection in the 2006 MLS Supplemental Draft by Chivas USA, who signed him to a developmental contract. He played sparingly during the 2006 season, making 8 appearances and starting just once.  Following the season, he left Chivas to join lower-division Portuguese club Marinhas for the remainder of the 2006/07 season. He joined Swedish club Bodens BK in summer 2008 for a contract spanning the last half of the Swedish season. Helm scored the winning goal for BBK in his debut for the club on August 10, 2008.

In 2010, he returned to Bodens BK during the autumn, and in the last game of the season he scored the goal that secured the club's status as a Division 1 team for 2011.

In 2012, Helm played for the Orlando City's under-23 team, starting the first game of the 2012 season on May 4.

In 2016, Helm signed with the South Florida Surf for the Premier Development League season.

References

External links

1984 births
Living people
American soccer players
American expatriate soccer players
South Florida Bulls men's soccer players
Chivas USA players
Bodens BK players
Orlando City U-23 players
People from Jupiter, Florida
Soccer players from Florida
Major League Soccer players
USL League Two players
Chivas USA draft picks
Association football forwards
South Florida Surf players